Naari is an Oriya film directed by Narendra Kumar Mitra & B. Trilochan and released on 25 January 1963. Film won National Film Award for Best Feature Film in Odia.

Plot
Jayanta is in love with Manashi and prepares to marry her. But before the wedding, he loses his sight. Then Manashi breaks off the engagement, leaving Jayantha disappointed.

During the treatment, Jayant is noticed by the kind nurse Malati. Trying to help him, she tries to return Manashi to him, but fails. She then pretends to be Manashi herself. And even donates one of his eyes to him.

Having regained his sight, Jayanta first tries to find Manashi. However, after learning the truth from the servant, he goes to Malati to save her from suicide at the last moment.

Cast
Aneema
Ashok
Durlabh

References

1963 films
1963 drama films
1960s Odia-language films